Cristina Del Basso (born 3 May 1987 in Varese) is an Italian model, showgirl and actress.

Personal life 
After two and a half years of love between Cristina Del Basso and Gianluca Colombo Feroli, on 1 November 2015 Riccardo Feroli, the couple's firstborn, was born: the love story between the showgirl and the businessman ended in 2016 because Gianluca Colombo Feroli has definitely left Cristina Del Basso (and their son).

Career

Television

Reality show 
 2008, Canale 5 - Veline
 2008, Canale 5 - Uomini e donne
 2009, Canale 5 - Grande Fratello 9
 2010, Canale 5 - Ciao Darwin 6
 2012, Canale 5 - Grande Fratello 12

Programs 
 Colorado Cafè (Italia 1, 2009)
 Fiesta (MTV, 2009)
 Salsa Rosa (Comedy Central, 2010)
 Domenica Cinque (Canale 5, 2009-2010)
 Pomeriggio Cinque (Canale 5, 2009-2010)
 Mattino Cinque (Canale 5, 2009-2011)
 Poker1mania (Italia 1, 2009-2012)
 La vita in diretta (Rai 1, 2010)
 A gentile richiesta (Canale 5, 2010)

Filmography

Cinema 
 A Natale mi sposo, directed by Paolo Costella (2010)
 I soliti idioti: Il film, directed by Enrico Lando (2011)
 I 2 soliti idioti, directed by Enrico Lando (2012)
 La mia mamma suona il rock, directed by Massimo Ceccherini (2013)
 Una vita da sogno, directed by Domenico Costanzo (2013)

Fiction 
 Un medico in famiglia 7 - TV series (Rai 1, 2011)
 Così fan tutte 2 - TV series (Italia 1, 2011-2012)
 SMS - Squadra molto speciale - TV series (Italia 1, 2010-2013)

Other activities

Nude calendars 
 2010 - Panorama
 2012 - Playboy Italia

Radio 
 2012, Radio 105 - Radio 105 special testimonial for Playboy Italia (visible on RTL 102.5)

Videoclip 
 2013, band Stil Novo - song Non dirmi mai di no

References

External links 
 
 Cristina Del Basso - jeunesseglobal
 

1987 births
Living people
Actors from Varese
People of Campanian descent
Italian female models
Participants in Italian reality television series